Connor Smith may refer to:

 Connor Smith (footballer, born 1993), Irish footballer for Wealdstone F.C.
 Connor Smith (footballer, born 1996), English footballer for Hartlepool United
 Connor Smith (footballer, born 2002), Scottish footballer for Hearts

See also
Con Smith